Gbemi Anthonia Adefuye , known professionally as Toni Tones , is a Nigerian media personality, actress, and photographer. In 2020, she was nominated for the Best Supporting Actress at the Africa Magic Viewers' Choice Awards.

Life
Adefuye  the youngest of a family of five. Her early education was in Lagos which she completed her studies at Queen's College. She modeled for Dakova because he was a friend of the family when she was fourteen.

Her full name is Gbemisola Anthonia Adefuye and she went to the University of Lancaster in the UK where she studied marketing and economics. When the course was completed, she returned to Nigeria in 2009 to explore her interest in show business. Her brother had been a musician with the band Oxygen and Tones initially decided to be a show business photographer. Her portfolio caught the attention of D'banj’s reality show, Koko Mansion.

In 2017, Adefuye Gbemisola continued to do photographic work but was then both behind and in front of the camera. She has appeared as an actor in the web TV series "Gidi-culture"; in several films, including It's Her Day in 2016. She also starred in the movie King of Boys. as the younger Eniola Salami. The movie premiered on October 21, 2020. At the 2020 AMVCA, she earned herself a nomination for 'Best Supporting Actress in a Movie or TV Series' for the movie 'King Of Boys'.

In 2020 she was in the cast of Quam's Money which is a sequel to the 2018 film New Money. The follow-up story follows what happens when a security guard (Quam) suddenly becomes a multi-millionaire. The new cast was led by Falz, Jemima Osunde, Blossom Chukwujekwu, Nse Ikpe-Etim and Tones.

Filmography

Television

Films

Awards and nominations

References

Living people
Nigerian photographers
People from Lagos
21st-century Nigerian women singers
Yoruba actors
Actresses from Lagos State
Nigerian film actresses
Nigerian television personalities
Year of birth missing (living people)
Nigerian women photographers
Residents of Lagos